Jiang Shengnan (born June 25, 1991) is a Chinese swimmer.

At the 2012 Summer Paralympics she won three bronze medals: at the Women's 50 metre freestyle S8 event, at the Women's 100 metre butterfly S8 event and at the Women's 200 metre individual medley SM8 event.

At the 2016 Summer Paralympics she won a gold medal at the Mixed 4x50meter freestyle relay-20 Points event, with a personal time of 30.52 and a total team time of 2:18.03, a world record and paralympic record. She also won a bronze medal at the Women's 50 metre freestyle S8 event with 30.53.

References

Living people
Swimmers at the 2016 Summer Paralympics
Medalists at the 2016 Summer Paralympics
Paralympic gold medalists for China
Paralympic bronze medalists for China
Paralympic swimmers of China
Chinese female butterfly swimmers
Chinese female freestyle swimmers
Chinese female medley swimmers
S8-classified Paralympic swimmers
1991 births
Swimmers at the 2012 Summer Paralympics
Medalists at the 2012 Summer Paralympics
Paralympic medalists in swimming
21st-century Chinese women